"Your Love Still Brings Me to My Knees" is a song originally recorded by British artist Dusty Springfield and released in the UK in early 1980. It was her last single release on the Mercury label, but failed to reach the UK charts, despite heavy radio airplay. It was later recorded by American-Australian singer Marcia Hines. The song was written by Bobby Wood, Roger Cook and produced by David Mackay and released in July 1981 as the lead single from Hines' fifth studio album, Take it From the Boys (1981). It became Hines' sixth (and, to date, final) Top 10 single in Australia. Later versions were recorded by The Duncans also in 1981 and Leo Sayer in 1982.

Marcia Hines Track listing
 Australian 7" Single (NiTE 001)
 "Your Love Still Brings Me to My Knees" (B. Wood, R. Cook) - 3:30
 "'Till It's Too Late" (C. Hull, M. Hines)

 Dutch 7" Single (FRS 009)
 "Your Love Still Brings Me to My Knees" - 5:20
 "All The Things We Do When We're Lonely" (Dean Pitchford, Tom Snow) - 3:50

Charts

Weekly charts

Year-end charts

References

Marcia Hines songs
1980 songs
1981 singles
American pop rock songs
Australian pop rock songs
Songs written by Bobby Wood (songwriter)
Songs written by Roger Cook (songwriter)